The Salem Observer (1823-1919) was a weekly newspaper published in Salem, Massachusetts. Among the editors: J.D.H. Gauss, Benj. Lynde Oliver, Gilbert L. Streeter, Joseph Gilbert Waters. Contributors included Wilson Flagg, Stephen B. Ives Jr., Edwin Jocelyn, E.M. Stone, Solomon S. Whipple. Publishers included Francis A. Fielden, Stephen B. Ives, William Ives, George W. Pease, Horace S. Traill. In the 1880s Elmira S. Cleaveland and Hattie E. Dennis worked as compositors. Its office was located in "'Messrs P. & A. Chase's ... brick building in Washington Street'" (1826-1832) and the Stearns Building (1832-1882). "In 1882 the proprietors erected the Observer Building, of three stories, of brick, in Kinsman Place next to the City Hall." As of the 1870s, one critic noted that although "the Observer is supposed to be neutral in politics, ... it has always shown unmistakable signs of a strong republican tendency."

Variant titles
 The Observer, 1823-1823
 Salem Observer, 1824-1825, 1828-1896
 Salem Literary & Commercial Observer, 1825-1827
 Saturday Evening Observer, 1896-1919

References

Defunct newspapers published in Massachusetts
Publications established in 1823
1919 disestablishments in the United States
History of Salem, Massachusetts
Mass media in Essex County, Massachusetts
Publications disestablished in 1919